The basketball tournaments of University Athletic Association of the Philippines (UAAP) Season 71 started on July 5, 2008 at the Araneta Coliseum with University of the Philippines, Diliman as hosts. The defending champions were the De La Salle Green Archers (men), Ateneo Lady Eagles (women) and the De La Salle Junior Archers (juniors).

Basketball Coaches Association of the Philippines president Chito Narvasa is the season's commissioner. The theme is "Filipino Leadership Through Sports Excellence".

Men's tournament

Teams

Elimination round

Team standings

Match-up results

Results

Second-seed playoff

Bracket

Semifinals

Ateneo vs. UE
The Ateneo Blue Eagles has the twice-to-beat advantage.

La Salle vs. FEU
The De La Salle Green Archers has the twice-to-beat advantage.

Finals

Finals Most Valuable Player:

Awards 

Most Valuable Player: 
Rookie of the Year:

Women's tournament

Elimination round
Games, which began on July 6, are held at the Blue Eagle Gym.

Team standings

Match-up results

Rivalry games

Second–seed playoff

Bracket

Semifinals

FEU vs. Adamson

UP vs. UST

Finals

Finals Most Valuable Player:

Awards 

The season's awardees were:

Most Valuable Player: 
Rookie of the Year: 
Mythical Five:

Juniors' tournament

Elimination round
Games, which began on July 9, are held at the Blue Eagle Gym

Team standings

Match-up results

Rivalry games

Bracket

Denotes number of overtime periods.

Semifinals

Ateneo vs. Adamson

DLSZ vs. FEU-FERN

Finals

 Finals Most Valuable Player:

Awards

The season's awardees were:
Most Valuable Player: 
Rookie of the Year: 
Mythical team:

Broadcast notes
Studio 23 broadcast all of the men's basketball games. UAAP Sports Center airs every Tuesday as a supplement to the coverage.

Playoff broadcasters are:

Champion rosters

Ateneo Blue Eagles
Years are years spent in the university, not number of years that he played for the team.

See also 
 NCAA Season 84 basketball tournaments

References

External links 
 UAAP Basketball at UBelt.com: Men's | Women's | Juniors'

71
2008–09 in Philippine college basketball
Basket